Cedar Creek High School may refer to:
Cedar Creek High School (New Jersey), Egg Harbor City, Atlantic County, New Jersey
Cedar Creek High School (Texas), Cedar Creek, Texas